Sunday Adeyemi Faleye (born 29 November 1998) is a Nigerian international footballer who plays for Shooting Stars, on loan from Czech club Dukla Prague, as a striker.

Club career
He has played club football for Shooting Stars and Akwa United. After playing in Austria for SCR Altach II and Wacker Innsbruck, he signed for Czech club Dukla Prague in January 2021.

He returned to Shooting Stars in February 2022, signing a loan contract.

International career
He made his international debut for Nigeria in 2018.

References

1998 births
Living people
Nigerian footballers
Nigeria international footballers
Shooting Stars S.C. players
Akwa United F.C. players
SC Rheindorf Altach players
FC Wacker Innsbruck (2002) players
FK Dukla Prague players
2. Liga (Austria) players
Austrian Regionalliga players
Czech National Football League players
Association football forwards
Nigerian expatriate footballers
Nigerian expatriate sportspeople in Austria
Expatriate footballers in Austria
Nigerian expatriate sportspeople in the Czech Republic
Expatriate footballers in the Czech Republic
Nigeria A' international footballers
2018 African Nations Championship players